"Put a Light in the Window" is a popular song written by Kenny Jacobson,  and Rhoda Roberts.

The Four Lads recorded the song on October 27, 1957, and a single was released by Columbia Records as catalog number 41058. It first reached the Billboard charts on December 9, 1957. On the Disk Jockey chart, it peaked at #8; on the Best Seller chart, at #39; on the composite chart of the top 100 songs, it reached #35.

The King Brothers covered the song which was released as a single in the UK in 1958 and reached #25 in the national chart.

References

1957 singles
The Four Lads songs